Ying Guo is a Chinese biostatistician specializing in biomedical imaging, neuroimaging, and high-dimensional data analysis. She is a professor of biostatistics and bioinformatics at Emory University, where she directs the Emory Center for Biomedical Imaging Statistics.

Education and career
Guo graduated from Renmin University of China in 1998, and earned a master's degree in statistics there in 2000. She completed a Ph.D. biostatistics at Emory University in 2004. Her dissertation, Assessing Agreement for Survival Outcomes, was supervised by Amita Manatunga. After continuing to work at Emory as a research assistant professor, she was given a tenure-track position in 2006. She became acting director of the Center for Biomedical Imaging Statistics in 2014, and director in 2016. She was promoted to full professor at Emory in 2019.

At Emory, her regular collaborators include two other female statisticians, Manatunga and Limin Peng.

Recognition
Guo was president of the Georgia chapter of the American Statistical Association for 2017–2018. In 2018, the American Statistical Association listed her as a Fellow of the American Statistical Association. She was elected chair of the ASA Statistics in Imaging program in 2021.

References

External links
Home page

Year of birth missing (living people)
Living people
Chinese statisticians
Women statisticians
Biostatisticians
Computer vision researchers
Neuroimaging researchers
Renmin University of China alumni
Emory University alumni
Emory University faculty
Fellows of the American Statistical Association
Chinese expatriates in the United States
Expatriate academics in the United States